Amanda Margaret Budden (born 9 May 1994) is an Irish footballer who plays as a goalkeeper for Shamrock Rovers and has appeared for the Republic of Ireland women's national team.

Club career
Budden is from Cork and began her soccer career with Wilton United. On 27 July 2008, she won the FAI Women's Under-14 National Cup, playing (outfield) in the final against Longford Town. On 7 August 2011, she kept goal in the FAI Women's Cup final, as Wilton United were defeated 3–1 by St Catherine's.

She joined newly-founded Cork Women's, one of the six teams that competed in the Women's National League's (WNL) inaugural 2011–12 season. On 13 November 2011, she made her debut in the new club's first league match; a 6–1 defeat by Peamount United.

Budden played in the 2017 FAI Women's Cup final, as Cork beat UCD Waves 1–0 at the Aviva Stadium in November 2017. Her best friend Clare Shine scored the winning goal. She transferred to Galway WFC ahead of the 2020 WNL season, which was delayed and truncated by the COVID-19 pandemic. For 2021 she joined Shelbourne.

At the end of a successful 2022 Women's National League campaign, in which she helped secure a League and Cup double for Shelbourne, Budden was among five players to leave the club for newly-reformed rivals Shamrock Rovers.

International career
In 2010, Budden was a member of the Republic of Ireland U-17 squad who were runners-up in the 2010 UEFA Women's Under-17 Championship and quarter-finalists in the 2010 FIFA U-17 Women's World Cup.

Budden has been capped for the senior Republic of Ireland national team, appearing for the team during the 2019 FIFA Women's World Cup qualifying cycle. In August 2018, with regular goalkeeper Marie Hourihan injured, Ireland coach Colin Bell gave Budden her debut in a 4–0 FIFA Women's World Cup qualifying win over Northern Ireland.

Shortly after making her national team debut, Budden took a year out of football to travel in North America.

References

External links
 
 
 

1994 births
Living people
Republic of Ireland women's association footballers
Republic of Ireland women's international footballers
Women's association football goalkeepers
Women's National League (Ireland) players
Galway W.F.C. players
Association footballers from County Cork
Cork City W.F.C. players
Expatriate women's soccer players in Canada
Cape Breton University alumni
Irish expatriate sportspeople in Canada
Shelbourne F.C. (women) players
Republic of Ireland women's youth international footballers